Sulopenem (CP-70,429) is an antibiotic derivative from the carbapenem family, which unlike most related drugs is orally active. It was developed in Japan in the 1990s but has never been approved for medical use, however it has reached Phase III clinical trials on several occasions and continues to be the subject of ongoing research into potential applications, especially in the treatment of multiple drug resistant urinary tract infections.

See also 
 Imipenem
 Tebipenem

References 

Carbapenem antibiotics